Uchucchacua is a mine in Oyón province, region Lima, Peru. The mine exploits primarily silver, zinc and lead.

Reference: Mindat - Uchucchacua mine

See Uchucchacuaite.

Silver mines in Peru
Zinc mines in Peru
Lead mines in Peru
Polymetallic Zn-Pb-Ag-Cu mines in Peru